The CANT 13 was an amphibious aircraft designed for use on Regia Marina ships in response to a 1925 competition.

Design
The CANT 13 was a conventional amphibious aircraft, a two-seater single-engined biplane amphibian with retractable undercarriage, made entirely of wood. The hull had an open two-seat side-by-side cockpit with an internal passage that allowed the second member of the crew to reach the two defensive positions, front and rear, both equipped with a machine gun. The equal span foldable wings were connected  by a pair of inter-plane struts on each side, braced by tie rods in steel cable, with the upper wing equipped with ailerons. The landing gear was manually retractable operated by the pilot. Propulsion was supplied by a Lorraine-Dietrich 12Db  liquid-cooled V-12 delivering , driving with a fixed-pitch 2-bladed propeller placed between the two wings above the hull on a tubular steel central supporting .

Development
In 1925 the Ministry of Aeronautics issued a specification for the supply of a new amphibious aircraft to equip naval units of the Regia Marina. The CNT took part in the competition with a project entrusted to the engineer Raffaele Conflenti.

Two aircraft were built and were evaluated by the Regia Aeronautica but due to changes in the plans of the General Staff, no mass production was decided, but they were employed by the Regia Marina for at least the following two years.

Specifications

See also

References

Further reading

 

cant 13
1920s Italian patrol aircraft
Flying boats
Biplanes
Aircraft first flown in 1925
Single-engined tractor aircraft